Max Henry McMillan (born 3 October 2002) is a professional footballer who plays as a forward for  club Fleetwood Town.

Early and personal life
McMillan is the son of former York City player Andy McMillan and the grandson of former Pretoria Callies coach Trevor McMillan, whilst his brother Alex was a scholar at Grimsby Town. He was born in York but is of South African descent through his father. He attended Joseph Rowntree School in York.

Club career
After playing youth football for Haxby Town at under-7s level, McMillan joined Leeds United's academy aged 8. He signed a two-year scholarship deal with the club in April 2019. On 23 April 2021, McMillan signed for League One club Fleetwood Town on a contract until the end of the 2022–23 season. He made his debut for Fleetwood Town on 5 October 2021 in a 3–1 win against Barrow in the EFL Trophy, and scored the final goal after latching onto a cross from Ryan Edmondson. McMillan joined Northern Premier League Premier Division club Radcliffe on a month-long loan on 17 February 2022.

International career
Being of South African descent through his father, McMillan is eligible to represent the Bafana Bafana, with his father Andy stating in October 2019 that he and his brother Alex were 'desperate' to represent South Africa.

Career statistics

References

External links

2002 births
Living people
English footballers
Footballers from York
Association football forwards
Leeds United F.C. players
Fleetwood Town F.C. players
Radcliffe F.C. players
Northern Premier League players
English people of South African descent